The All-China Federation of Trade Unions (ACFTU) is the national trade union center of the People's Republic of China. It is the largest trade union in the world with 302 million members in 1,713,000 primary trade union organizations. The ACFTU is divided into 31 regional federations and 10 national industrial unions. The ACFTU is the country's sole legally mandated trade union, with which all enterprise-level trade unions must be affiliated. There has been dispute over whether ACFTU is an independent trade union or even a trade union at all. It directs a public college, the China University of Labor Relations.

History
The Federation was officially founded on 1 May 1925, when the "Second National Labor Congress" of China convened in Canton with 277 delegates representing 540,000 workers, and adopted the Constitution of the All-China Federation of Trade Unions. Between 1922 and 1927, the organization flourished, as did the Chinese Communist Party’s control over the trade union movement. The labor movement had grown enormously, particularly in the three industrial and commercial centers of Canton, Hong Kong, and Shanghai, but it also had some organizational success in other cities such as Wuhan.   The ACFTU was restricted in 1927 by the newly established rule of the Nationalist regime under Chiang Kai-shek, who had ordered the execution of thousands of CPC cadres and their sympathizers as part of a crackdown on Communism. All Communist Party-led unions were banned and replaced with yellow unions loyal to him (e.g. the "Chinese Federation of Labor," which has since reformed into an independent union).

By the rise of Mao Zedong in 1949, the ACFTU was established as China's sole national labor union center, but was again dissolved in 1966 in the wake of the Cultural Revolution in favor of revolutionary committees. Following Mao's death in 1976, in October 1978 the ACFTU held its first congress since 1957. Since the early 1990s it has been regulated by the Trade Union Law of the People’s Republic of China. According to a 2011 study during the period of rapid economic growth in China the ACFTU has prioritized the interests of business over the interests of labor and has lost legitimacy in the eyes of many laborers.

In 2018, the 17th National Congress of the All-China Federation of Trade Unions was held at the Great Hall of the People in Beijing. At the congress Union leadership faced pressure to stop acting as a bridge or mediator between workers and management and start acting as a genuine voice of the workers. This pressure arose both internally and was also applied by the Chinese Communist Party.

Lack of independence 

The International Confederation of Free Trade Unions (now the International Trade Union Confederation) maintains the position that the ACFTU is not an independent union, stating in its policy:  There are differing approaches among ICFTU affiliates and Global Union Federations concerning contacts with the ACFTU ranging from “no contacts” to “constructive dialog.” The ICFTU, noting that the ACFTU is not an independent trade union organization and, therefore, cannot be regarded as an authentic voice of Chinese workers, reaffirms its request to all affiliates and Global Union Federations having contacts with the Chinese authorities, including the ACFTU, to engage in critical dialog. This includes raising violations of fundamental workers’ and trade union rights in any such meetings, especially concerning cases of detention of trade union and labor rights activists.

According to Charter of China Trade Union, which is passed by the 17th National Congress of China Trade Unions on 26 October 2018, "The China Trade Union is a mass organization of the working class led by the Chinese Communist Party and a voluntary union of employees. It is a bridge and link between the Chinese Communist Party and the masses of workers, an important social pillar of the state power, and a representative of the interests of its members and workers." " The China trade unions persist in consciously accepting the leadership of the Chinese Communist Party, shoulder the political responsibility of uniting and guiding the workers and the masses to listen to and follow the Communist Party of China, and consolidate and expand the class basis and mass basis of the Communist Party of China’s governance."

ACFTU activist Guo Wencai has said that democratic elections were a key standard to measure the effectiveness of a trade union and noted that the practice of Chinese company chiefs "appointing union leaders or assigning someone from their human resources department to act as union leader hampers a trade union's independence and its ability to protect workers' rights."

Other labor activism in China 

The ACFTU remains the country's only legally permissible trade union. Attempts to form trade unions independent of the ACFTU have been rare and short-lived. One notable example is the Beijing Workers' Autonomous Federation formed during the 1989 Tiananmen Square protests. Martial Law Command Headquarters issued a public notice declaring the BWAF an illegal organization and ordering it to disband on the grounds that Federation leaders were among "the main instigators and organizers in the capital of the counterrevolutionary rebellion."

The failure of the ACFTU to advocate for workers has led to an increase in wildcat strikes and other unauthorized labor action. Wildcat strikes are one of few options available to workers because the ACFTU refuses to authorize strikes no matter what the conditions are.

Member organizations
 All-China Federation of Railway Workers' Unions
 China University of Labor Relations
 National Committee of the Chinese Agricultural, Forestry and Water Conservancy Workers' Union
 National Committee of the Chinese Aviation Workers' Union
 National Committee of the Chinese Banking Workers' Union
 National Committee of the Chinese Defense Industry, Postal and Telecommunications Workers' Union
 National Committee of the Chinese Educational, Scientific, Cultural, Medical and Sports Workers' Union
 National Committee of the Chinese Energy and Chemical Workers' Union
 National Committee of the Chinese Financial, Commercial, Light Industry, Textile and Tobacco Workers' Union
 National Committee of the Chinese Machinery, Metallurgical and Building Material Workers' Union
 National Committee of the Chinese Seamen and Construction Workers' Union

Regional affiliates
 Hong Kong Federation of Trade Unions
 Macau Federation of Trade Unions

List of chairmen

Note: Until 1987, Wade-Giles was the standard romanized system for Chinese even pinyin was introduced in 1958. Current pinyin names are included in parentheses.
 1st (May 1922 – May 1925)
 Teng Chung-hsia (Deng Zhongxia)
 2nd (May 1925 – May 1926)
 Lin Wêi-min (Lin Weimin) (ACFTU officially formed)
 3rd (May 1926 – June 1927)
 Su Chao-chêng (Su Zhaozheng)
 4th (June 1927 – November 1929)
 Su Chao-cheng (Su Zhaozheng)
 5th (November 1929 – August 1948)
 Hsiang Ying (Xiang Ying)
 6th (August 1948 – May 1953)
 Liu Shao-chi (Liu Shaoqi) (honorary)
 Ch'ên Yün (Chen Yun)
 7th (May 1953 – December 1957)
 Liu Shao-chi (Liu Shaoqi) (honorary)
 Lai Jo-yu (Lai Ruoyu)
 8th (December 1957 – December 1966)
 Lai Jo-yu (Lai Ruoyu) (December 1957 – May 1958)
 Liu Ning-yi (Liu Ningyi) (August 1958 – December 1966)
 9th (October 1978 – October 1983)
 Ni Chi-fu (Ni Zhifu)
 10th (October 1983 – October 1988)
 Ni Chi-fu (Ni Zhifu)
 11th (October 1988 – October 1993)
 Ni Zhifu
 12th (October 1993 – October 1998)
 Wei Jianxing
 13th (October 1998 – October 2003)
 Wei Jianxing (October 1998 – December 2002)
 Wang Zhaoguo (December 2002 – October 2003)
 14th (October 2003 – October 2008)
 Wang Zhaoguo
 15th (October 2008 – October 2013)
 Wang Zhaoguo (− March 2013)
 Li Jianguo (March 2013 – October 2013)
 16th (October 2013 – October 2018)
 Li Jianguo (− March 2018)
 Wang Dongming (March 2018 – October 2018)
 17th (October 2018 –)
 Wang Dongming

See also

 Labor Contract Law of China
 Ministry of Human Resources and Social Security of the People's Republic of China, previously the Ministry of Labor and Social Security
 China Labour Bulletin
 China Labor Watch
All-China Women's Federation
Communist Youth League of China
Young Pioneers of China
Chinese Peasants‘ Association
China Institute of Industrial Relations

References

External links
 Workers' Daily (Gongren Ribao) Official newspaper of the ACFTU
 The ILO in China

 
1925 establishments in China
Trade unions established in 1925
Organizations associated with the Chinese Communist Party
National federations of trade unions
Trade unions in China